Seriah ben Neriah was a Jewish aristocrat of the sixth century BCE. He was the son of Neriah and the brother of Baruch ben Neriah, the disciple of the biblical prophet Jeremiah.

Seriah served as chamberlain of King Zedekiah of Judah.

References

Prophets in Judaism
6th-century BCE Jews
Chamberlains
Baruch ben Neriah